Yaoxing lun, literally Treatise on the Nature of Medicinal Herbs, is a 7th-century Tang Dynasty Chinese treatise on herbal medicine.

See also
Chinese herbology
Compendium of Materia Medica
Pharmacognosy
Traditional Chinese medicine

References

Chinese medical texts
Tang dynasty literature
7th-century Chinese books